A dandy is a man who places particular importance upon physical appearance and personal grooming, refined language and leisurely hobbies; every activity pursued with apparent nonchalance. A dandy could be a self-made man in person and persona, who imitated an aristocratic style of life, despite his middle-class origin, birth, and background, especially in the Britain of the late-18th and early-19th centuries.

Early manifestations of dandyism were Le petit-maître (the Little Master) and the musky Muscadin ruffians of the middle-class Thermidorean reaction (1794–1795), but modern dandyism appeared in the stratified societies of Europe during the revolutionary period of the 1790s, especially in cultural centres such as London and in Paris. Socially, the dandy cultivated a persona of extreme cynical reserve to the degree that the Victorian novelist George Meredith defined such posed cynicism as "intellectual dandyism"; whereas the kinder Thomas Carlyle, in the novel Sartor Resartus (1831), dismissed the dandy as just "a clothes-wearing man"; and Honoré de Balzac in La fille aux yeux d'or (1835) chronicled the idle life of Henri de Marsay, a model French dandy done in by his obsessive Romanticism in pursuit of love, which included yielding to sexual passion and murderous jealousy.

In the metaphysical phase of dandyism, the poet Charles Baudelaire defined the dandy as a man who elevates æsthetics to a religion. That the dandy is an existential reproach of the conformity of the middle-class man, because “dandyism, in certain respects, comes close to spirituality and to stoicism” as an approach to living daily life. That “these beings, have no other status, but that of cultivating the idea of beauty in their own persons, of satisfying their passions, of feeling and thinking . . . [because] Dandyism is a form of Romanticism. Contrary to what many thoughtless people seem to believe, dandyism is not even an excessive delight in clothes and material elegance. For the perfect dandy, these [material] things are no more than the symbol of the aristocratic superiority of mind.”

The linkage of clothing and political protest was a particularly English national characteristic in 18th-century Britain; the sociologic connotation is that dandyism was a reactionary protest against social equality, against the levelling effect of egalitarian principles, thus the dandy is nostalgic for feudal values and the ideals of the perfect gentleman and the autonomous aristocrat — men of self-made person and persona. Paradoxically, the social existence of the dandy required the gaze of spectators, an audience, and readers for their "successfully marketed lives" in the public sphere, as in the cases of the playwright Oscar Wilde and the poet Lord Byron, each of whom personified the two social roles of the dandy: (i) the dandy-as-writer, and (ii) the dandy-as-persona; each role a source of gossip and scandal, each man limited to entertaining high society.

Etymology 
In the late 18th century, the word dandy was an abbreviated usage of the term jack-a-dandy, a 17th-century British usage that described a conceited man. In British North America, before the American Revolution (1765–1791), the British version of the song Yankee Doodle, specifically the first verse: “Yankee Doodle went to town, / Upon a little pony; / He stuck a feather in his hat, / And called it Macoroni . . .”; and the chorus: “Yankee Doodle, keep it up, / Yankee Doodle Dandy, / Mind the music and the step, / And with the girls be handy. . . .” derided the rustic manner and poverty of colonial Americans, by implying that Macoroni fashion (a fine horse and gold-braided clothing) was what set a dandy apart from colonial society. Moreover, there is an Anglo–Scottish  border ballad (ca. 1780) that uses the word dandy with a Scots meaning, not the derisive British usage in colonial North America. Since the 18th century, contemporary British usage has distinguished between a dandy and a fop in that the wardrobe of a dandy is more sober and refined than the ostentatious wardrobe of a fop.

British dandyism

Beau Brummell (George Bryan Brummell, 1778–1840) was the model British dandy since his days as an undergraduate at Oriel College, Oxford, and later as an associate of the Prince Regent (George IV) — all despite not being an aristocrat. Always bathed and shaved, always powdered and perfumed, always groomed and immaculately dressed in a dark-blue coat of plain style. Sartorially, the look of Brummel's tailoring was perfectly fitted, clean, and displayed much linen; an elaborately knotted cravat completed the aesthetics of Brummell's suite of clothes. In the mid–1790s, handsome Beau Brummell was a personable man-about-town who was famous for being famous; a man celebrated “based on nothing at all” but personal charm and social connections.

In the national politics of the Regency era (1795–1837), by the time that P.M. William Pitt the Younger had realised the Duty on Hair Powder Act (1795) to pay for Britain's wars against France — and to discourage the use of a foodstuff as hair powder — in the high society of Regency London, the dandy Brummell already had abandoned wearing a powdered wig and wore his hair cut à la Brutus, in the Roman fashion. Moreover, Brummel also led the sartorial progress from breeches to tailored pantaloons, which became modern trousers.

Upon coming of age in 1799, Brummell received a paternal inheritance of thirty thousand pounds sterling, which he spent on a high life of casinos, tailors, and brothels. After bankruptcy in 1816, Brummel fled England to France, whilst pursued by creditors and lived in penury; in 1840, at sixty-one years of age, Beau Brummel died in a lunatic asylum in Caen. Nonetheless, despite his ignominious end, European men emulated Brummell’s dandyism; thus, the poetical persona of Lord Byron wore a poet’s shirt featuring a lace-collar, a lace-placket, and lace-cuffs, which Byron wore in a portrait of himself in Albanian national costume in 1813; and likewise the Count d’Orsay who was a social butterfly among the upper-class social circles of his friend Lord Byron.

In “The Dandiacal Body”, a chapter of the novel Sartor Resartus (1831), Thomas Carlyle described the dandy's symbolic social function as a man and as a persona of refined masculinity:A Dandy is a Clothes-wearing Man, a Man whose trade, office and existence consists in the wearing of Clothes. Every faculty of his soul, spirit, purse, and person is heroically consecrated to this one object, the wearing of Clothes wisely and well: so that as others dress to live, he lives to dress. . . . And now, for all this perennial Martyrdom, and Poesy, and even Prophecy, what is it that the Dandy asks in return? Solely, we may say, that you would recognise his existence; would admit him to be a living object; or even failing this, a visual object, or thing that will reflect rays of light.

In the mid-19th century, within the limited palette of muted colours allowed for the clothes of men, the English dandy gave much attention to the details of sartorial refinement (design, cut, and style), such as: “The quality of the fine woollen cloth, the slope of a pocket flap or coat revers, exactly the right colour for the gloves, the correct amount of shine on boots and shoes, and so on. It was an image of a well-dressed man who, while taking infinite pains about his appearance, affected indifference to it. This refined dandyism continued to be regarded as an essential strand of male Englishness.”

French dandyism

In monarchic France, dandyism was ideologically bound to the egalitarian politics of the French Revolution (1789–1799); thus the dandyism of the jeunesse dorée (the Gilded Youth) was their political statement of aristocratic style in effort to differentiate and distinguish themselves from the working-class sans-culottes, from the poor men who owned no stylish knee-breeches made of silk.

In the late 18th century, British and French men abided Beau Brummell's dictates about fashion and etiquette, especially the French bohemians who closely imitated Brummell's habits of dress, manner, and style. In that time of political progress, French dandies were celebrated as social revolutionaries who were self-created men possessed of a consciously-designed personality, men whose way of being broke with inflexible tradition that limited the social progress of greater French society; thus, with their elaborate dress and decadent styles of life, the French dandies conveyed their moral superiority to and political contempt for the conformist bourgeoisie.

Regarding the social function of the dandy in a stratified society, like the British writer Carlyle, in Sartor Resartus, the French poet Baudelaire said that dandies have "no profession other than elegance . . . no other [social] status, but that of cultivating the idea of beauty in their own persons. . . . The dandy must aspire to be sublime without interruption; he must live and sleep before a mirror." Likewise, French intellectuals investigated the sociology of the dandies (flâneurs) who strolled Parisian boulevards; in the essay “On Dandyism and George Brummell” (1845)  Jules Amédée Barbey d'Aurevilly analysed the personal and social career of Beau Brummell as a man-about-town who arbitrated what was fashionable and what was unfashionable in polite society.

In the late 19th century, dandified bohemianism was characteristic of the artists who were the Symbolist movement in French poetry and literature, wherein the “Truth of Art” included the artist to the work of art.

Dandy sociology

Regarding the existence and the political and cultural functions of the dandy in a society, in the essay L'Homme révolté (1951) Albert Camus said that:

The dandy creates his own unity by aesthetic means. But it is an aesthetic of negation. To live and die before a mirror: that, according to Baudelaire, was the dandy's slogan. It is indeed a coherent slogan. The dandy is, by occupation, always in opposition [to society]. He can only exist by defiance . . . The dandy, therefore, is always compelled to astonish. Singularity is his vocation, excess his way to perfection. Perpetually incomplete, always on the fringe of things, he compels others to create him, while denying their values. He plays at life because he is unable to live [life].

Further addressing that vein of male narcissism, in the book Simulacra and Simulation (1981),  Jean Baudrillard said that dandyism is "an aesthetic form of nihilism" that is centred upon the Self as the centre of the world.

Quaintrelle 

The counterpart to the dandy is thequaintrelle, a woman whose life is dedicated to the passionate expression of personal charm and style, to enjoying leisurely pastimes, and the dedicated cultivation of the pleasures of life.

In the 12th century, cointerrels (male) and cointrelles (female) emerged, based upon coint, a word applied to things skillfully made, later indicating a person of beautiful dress and refined speech. By the 18th century, coint became quaint, indicating elegant speech and beauty.  Middle English dictionaries note quaintrelle as a beautifully dressed woman (or overly dressed), but do not include the favorable personality elements of grace and charm.  The notion of a quaintrelle sharing the major philosophical components of refinement with dandies is a modern development that returns quaintrelles to their historic roots.

Female dandies did overlap with male dandies for a brief period during the early 19th century when dandy had a derisive definition of "fop" or "over-the-top fellow"; the female equivalents were dandyess or dandizette. Charles Dickens, in All the Year Around (1869) comments, "The dandies and dandizettes of 1819–20 must have been a strange race. "Dandizette" was a term applied to the feminine devotees to dress, and their absurdities were fully equal to those of the dandies." In 1819, Charms of Dandyism, in three volumes, was published by Olivia Moreland, Chief of the Female Dandies; most likely one of many pseudonyms used by Thomas Ashe. Olivia Moreland may have existed, as Ashe did write several novels about living persons. Throughout the novel, dandyism is associated with "living in style".  Later, as the word dandy evolved to denote refinement, it became applied solely to men. Popular Culture and Performance in the Victorian City (2003) notes this evolution in the latter 19th century: ". . . or dandizette, although the term was increasingly reserved for men."

See also 
 Adonis
 Bishōnen
 Dandy and Dedicated Follower of Fashion, songs by The Kinks that parody modern (1960s) dandyism.
 Dude
 Effeminacy
 Flâneur
 Fop
 Gentleman
 Hipster (contemporary subculture)
 Incroyables and Merveilleuses
 La Sape
 Macaroni (fashion)
 Metrosexual
 Narcissus (mythology)
 Personal branding
 Preppy
 Risqué
 Swenkas
 Zoot suit (a style of clothing)

References

Further reading 
 Barbey d'Aurevilly, Jules.  Of Dandyism and of George Brummell.  Translated by Douglas Ainslie.  New York: PAJ Publications, 1988.
 Botz-Bornstein, Thorsten. 'Rulefollowing in Dandyism: Style as an Overcoming of Rule and Structure' in The Modern Language Review 90, April 1995, pp. 285–295. 
 Carassus, Émile. Le Mythe du Dandy 1971.
 Carlyle, Thomas.  Sartor Resartus.  In A Carlyle Reader: Selections from the Writings of Thomas Carlyle.  Edited by G.B. Tennyson.  London: Cambridge University Press, 1984.
 Jesse, Captain William.  The Life of Beau Brummell.  London: The Navarre Society Limited, 1927.
 Lytton, Edward Bulwer, Lord Lytton.  Pelham or the Adventures of a Gentleman.  Edited by Jerome McGann.  Lincoln: University of Nebraska Press, 1972.
 Moers, Ellen.  The Dandy: Brummell to Beerbohm.  London: Secker and Warburg, 1960.
 Murray, Venetia.  An Elegant Madness: High Society in Regency England.  New York: Viking, 1998.
 Nicolay, Claire.  Origins and Reception of Regency Dandyism: Brummell to Baudelaire. PhD diss., Loyola U of Chicago, 1998.
 Prevost, John C., Le Dandysme en France (1817–1839) (Geneva and Paris) 1957.
 Nigel Rodgers  The Dandy: Peacock or Enigma? (London) 2012
 Stanton, Domna. The Aristocrat as Art 1980.
 Wharton, Grace and Philip.  Wits and Beaux of Society.  New York: Harper and Brothers, 1861.

External links 

 La Loge d'Apollon
 "Bohemianism and Counter-Culture": The Dandy 
 Il Dandy (in Italian)
 Dandyism.net
 "The Dandy"
 Walter Thornbury, Dandysme.eu  "London Parks: IV. Hyde Park",  Belgravia: A London Magazine 1868

1790s fashion
19th-century fashion
Androgyny
History of clothing (Western fashion)
Human appearance
Middle class culture
Narcissism
Terms for men
Upper class culture
Art Nouveau
Male beauty
Lifestyles
1790s neologisms